Intuitionistic logic, sometimes more generally called constructive logic, refers to systems of symbolic logic that differ from the systems used for classical logic by more closely mirroring the notion of constructive proof. In particular, systems of intuitionistic logic do not assume the law of the excluded middle and double negation elimination, which are fundamental inference rules in classical logic.

Formalized intuitionistic logic was originally developed by Arend Heyting to provide a formal basis for L. E. J. Brouwer's programme of intuitionism. From a proof-theoretic perspective, Heyting’s calculus is a restriction of classical logic in which the law of excluded middle and double negation elimination have been removed.  Excluded middle and double negation elimination can still be proved for some propositions on a case by case basis, however, but do not hold universally as they do with classical logic. The standard explanation of intuitionistic logic is the BHK interpretation.

Several systems of semantics for intuitionistic logic have been studied. One of these semantics mirrors classical Boolean-valued semantics but uses Heyting algebras in place of Boolean algebras. Another semantics uses Kripke models. These, however, are technical means for studying Heyting’s deductive system rather than formalizations of Brouwer’s original informal semantic intuitions. Semantical systems claiming to capture such intuitions, due to offering meaningful concepts of “constructive truth” (rather than merely validity or provability), are Kurt Gödel’s dialectica interpretation, Stephen Cole Kleene’s realizability, Yurii Medvedev’s logic of finite problems, or Giorgi Japaridze’s computability logic.  Yet such semantics persistently induce logics properly stronger than Heyting’s logic. Some authors have argued that this might be an indication of inadequacy of Heyting’s calculus itself, deeming the latter incomplete as a constructive logic.

Mathematical constructivism 

In the semantics of classical logic, propositional formulae are assigned truth values from the two-element set  ("true" and "false" respectively), regardless of whether we have direct evidence for either case. This is referred to as the 'law of excluded middle', because it excludes the possibility of any truth value besides 'true' or 'false'. In contrast, propositional formulae in intuitionistic logic are not assigned a definite truth value and are only considered "true" when we have direct evidence, hence proof. (We can also say, instead of the propositional formula being "true" due to direct evidence, that it is inhabited by a proof in the Curry–Howard sense.) Operations in intuitionistic logic therefore preserve justification, with respect to evidence and provability, rather than truth-valuation.

Intuitionistic logic is a commonly-used tool in developing approaches to constructivism in mathematics. The use of constructivist logics in general has been a controversial topic among mathematicians and philosophers (see, for example, the Brouwer–Hilbert controversy). A common objection to their use is the above-cited lack of two central rules of classical logic, the law of excluded middle and double negation elimination. These are considered to be so important to the practice of mathematics that David Hilbert wrote of them: "Taking the principle of excluded middle from the mathematician would be the same, say, as proscribing the telescope to the astronomer or to the boxer the use of his fists. To prohibit existence statements and the principle of excluded middle is tantamount to relinquishing the science of mathematics altogether."

Despite the serious challenges presented by the inability to utilize the valuable rules of excluded middle and double negation elimination, intuitionistic logic has practical use. One reason for this is that its restrictions produce proofs that have the existence property, making it also suitable for other forms of mathematical constructivism. Informally, this means that if there is a constructive proof that an object exists, that constructive proof may be used as an algorithm for generating an example of that object, a principle known as the Curry–Howard correspondence between proofs and algorithms. One reason that this particular aspect of intuitionistic logic is so valuable is that it enables practitioners to utilize a wide range of computerized tools, known as proof assistants. These tools assist their users in the verification (and generation) of large-scale proofs, whose size usually precludes the usual human-based checking that goes into publishing and reviewing a mathematical proof. As such, the use of proof assistants (such as Agda or Coq) is enabling modern mathematicians and logicians to develop and prove extremely complex systems, beyond those that are feasible to create and check solely by hand. One example of a proof that was impossible to satisfactorily verify without formal verification is the famous proof of the four color theorem. This theorem stumped mathematicians for more than a hundred years, until a proof was developed that ruled out large classes of possible counterexamples, yet still left open enough possibilities that a computer program was needed to finish the proof. That proof was controversial for some time, but, later, it was verified using Coq.

Syntax

The syntax of formulas of intuitionistic logic is similar to propositional logic or first-order logic. However, intuitionistic connectives are not definable in terms of each other in the same way as in classical logic, hence their choice matters. In intuitionistic first-order logic both quantifiers ∃, ∀ are needed.

Weaker than classical logic 

Intuitionistic logic can be understood as a weakening of classical logic, meaning that it is more conservative in what it allows a reasoner to infer, while not permitting any new inferences that could not be made under classical logic. Each theorem of intuitionistic logic is a theorem in classical logic, but not conversely. Many tautologies in classical logic are not theorems in intuitionistic logicin particular, as said above, one of intuitionistic logic's chief aims is to not affirm the law of the excluded middle so as to vitiate the use of non-constructive proof by contradiction, which can be used to furnish existence claims without providing explicit examples of the objects that it proves exist. We say "not affirm" because while it is not necessarily true that the law is upheld in any context, no counterexample can be given: such a counterexample would be an inference (inferring the negation of the law for a certain proposition) disallowed under classical logic and thus is not allowed in a strict weakening like intuitionistic logic. Indeed, the double negation of the law is retained as a tautology of the system: that is, it is a theorem that  regardless of the proposition . So the propositional calculus is always compatible with classical logic. The situation is more intricate for predicate logic formulas when quantified expressions are negated.

Sequent calculus

Gerhard Gentzen discovered that a simple restriction of his system LK (his sequent calculus for classical logic) results in a system that is sound and complete with respect to intuitionistic logic.  He called this system LJ.  In LK any number of formulas is allowed to appear on the conclusion side of a sequent; in contrast LJ allows at most one formula in this position.

Other derivatives of LK are limited to intuitionistic derivations but still allow multiple conclusions in a sequent.  LJ'  is one example.

Hilbert-style calculus 
Intuitionistic logic can be defined using the following Hilbert-style calculus. This is similar to a way of axiomatizing classical propositional logic.

In propositional logic, the inference rule is modus ponens
and the axioms are
 THEN-1: 
 THEN-2: 
 AND-1: 
 AND-2: 
 AND-3: 
 OR-1: 
 OR-2: 
 OR-3: 
 FALSE: 
To make this a system of first-order predicate logic, the generalization rules
 -GEN: from  infer , if  is not free in 
 -GEN: from  infer , if  is not free in 
are added, along with the axioms
 PRED-2: , with the same restriction as for PRED-1

Optional connectives

Negation 
 NOT-1': 
 NOT-2': 

There are a number of alternatives available if one wishes to omit the connective  (false). For example, one may replace the three axioms FALSE, NOT-1', and NOT-2' with the two axioms
 NOT-1: 
 NOT-2: 

Equivalence 
Alternatively, one may add the axioms

 IFF-1: 
 IFF-2: 
 IFF-3: 

IFF-1 and IFF-2 can, if desired, be combined into a single axiom  using conjunction.

Relation to classical logic 
The system of classical logic is obtained by adding any one of the following axioms:

  (Law of the excluded middle.
  (Double negation elimination)
  (Peirce's law)
  (Law of contraposition)

In general, one may take as the extra axiom any classical tautology that is not valid in the two-element Kripke frame  (in other words, that is not included in Smetanich's logic).

Another relationship is given by the Gödel–Gentzen negative translation, which provides an embedding of classical first-order logic into intuitionistic logic: a first-order formula is provable in classical logic if and only if its Gödel–Gentzen translation is provable intuitionistically. Therefore, intuitionistic logic can instead be seen as a means of extending classical logic with constructive semantics.

In 1932, Kurt Gödel defined a system of logics intermediate between classical and intuitionistic logic; Gödel logics are concomitantly known as intermediate logics.

Admissible rules
In intuitionistic logic or a fixed theory using the logic, the situation can occur that an implication always hold metatheoretically, but not in the language. One says the system is closed under these implications as rules and they may be adopted.

Non-interdefinability of operators
In classical propositional logic, it is possible to take one of conjunction, disjunction, or implication as primitive, and define the other two in terms of it together with negation, such as in Łukasiewicz's three axioms of propositional logic. It is even possible to define all four in terms of a sole sufficient operator such as the Peirce arrow (NOR) or Sheffer stroke (NAND). Similarly, in classical first-order logic, one of the quantifiers can be defined in terms of the other and negation.
These are fundamentally consequences of the law of bivalence, which makes all such connectives merely Boolean functions. 

The law of bivalence is not required to hold in intuitionistic logic, only the law of non-contradiction. As a result, none of the basic connectives can be dispensed with, and the above axioms are all necessary. So most of the classical identities between connectives and quantifiers are only theorems of intuitionistic logic in one direction. Some of the theorems go in both directions, i.e. are equivalences, as subsequently discussed.
Below follows a list of implications involving negations. Combining the axioms THEN-1 and THEN-2 above,  follows, a conversion which can be used to obtain further implications.

Existential versus universal quantification:
 
 
And conversely,
 
 

There are finite variations of those with just two propositions.

Disjunction vs conjunction:
 
 
 
And conversely,
 
 
 

So negated statements are weak antecedents, and in turn not all of the classical De Morgan's laws hold.

Going on,

Conjunction vs. implication:
 
 
And conversely,
 
 

The latter are forms of the disjunctive syllogism for negated propositions, . A strenghtenend form still holds in intuitionistic logic, as follows.

Disjunction versus implication:
 
 
So, for example, intuitionistically "Either  or " is a stronger propositional formula than "If not , then ", whereas these are classically interchangeable. Such an implication for general  is not valid in minimal logic.

Equivalences:

The above lists also contain equivalences. 
Both sides of the equivalence can be understood as conjunctions of independent implications (of absurdity). In functional interpretations, it corresponds to if-clause constructions.
So e.g. "Not ( or )" is equivalent to "Not , and also not ".
Secondly, the equivalence involving an implication and a conjunction corresponds to currying. Due to the symmetry of the conjunction connective, it again implies

Special cases of this conversion make up the previous lists. The symmetry of the conjunction can also understood as reason for why negation of  can be moved between antecedent and consequent in the first two lists above.

The equivalences in the lists can be jointly generalized to the equivalence

An equivalence itself is generally defined as, and then equivalent to, a conjunction of implications 
 
With it, such connectives become in turn definable from it:
 
 
 
 

Functionally complete connectives:

As shown by Alexander V. Kuznetsov, either of the following connectives – the first one ternary, the second one quinary – is by itself functionally complete: either one can serve the role of a sole sufficient operator for intuitionistic propositional logic, thus forming an analog of the Sheffer stroke from classical propositional logic:

Semantics
The semantics are rather more complicated than for the classical case. A model theory can be given by Heyting algebras or, equivalently, by Kripke semantics. Recently, a Tarski-like model theory was proved complete by Bob Constable, but with a different notion of completeness than classically.

Unproved statements in intuitionistic logic are not given an intermediate truth value (as is sometimes mistakenly asserted). One can prove that such statements have no third truth value, a result dating back to Glivenko in 1928. Instead they remain of unknown truth value, until they are either proved or disproved. Statements are disproved by deducing a contradiction from them.

A consequence of this point of view is that intuitionistic logic has no interpretation as a two-valued logic, nor even as a finite-valued logic, in the familiar sense. Although intuitionistic logic retains the trivial propositions  from classical logic, each proof of a propositional formula is considered a valid propositional value, thus by Heyting's notion of propositions-as-sets, propositional formulae are (potentially non-finite) sets of their proofs.

Heyting algebra semantics
In classical logic, we often discuss the truth values that a formula can take. The values are usually chosen as the members of a Boolean algebra.  The meet and join operations in the Boolean algebra are identified with the ∧ and ∨ logical connectives, so that the value of a formula of the form A ∧ B is the meet of the value of A and the value of B in the Boolean algebra.  Then we have the useful theorem that a formula is a valid proposition of classical logic if and only if its value is 1 for every valuation—that is, for any assignment of values to its variables.

A corresponding theorem is true for intuitionistic logic, but instead of assigning each formula a value from  a Boolean algebra, one uses values from a Heyting algebra, of which Boolean algebras are a special case. A formula is valid in intuitionistic logic if and only if it receives the value of the top element for any valuation on any Heyting algebra.

It can be shown that to recognize valid formulas, it is sufficient to consider a single Heyting algebra whose elements are the open subsets of the real line R. In this algebra we have:

where int(X) is the interior of X and  X∁ its complement.

The last identity concerning A → B allows us to calculate the value of ¬A:

With these assignments, intuitionistically valid formulas are precisely those that are assigned the value of the entire line. For example, the formula ¬(A ∧ ¬A) is valid, because no matter what set X is chosen as the value of the formula A, the value of ¬(A ∧ ¬A) can be shown to be the entire line:

So the valuation of this formula is true, and indeed the formula is valid. But the law of the excluded middle, A ∨ ¬A, can be shown to be invalid by using a specific value of the set of positive real numbers for A:

The interpretation of any intuitionistically valid formula in the infinite Heyting algebra described above results in the top element, representing true, as the valuation of the formula, regardless of what values from the algebra are assigned to the variables of the formula. Conversely, for every invalid formula, there is an assignment of values to the variables that yields a valuation that differs from the top element. No finite Heyting algebra has the second of these two properties.

Kripke semantics

Building upon his work on semantics of modal logic, Saul Kripke created another semantics for intuitionistic logic, known as Kripke semantics or relational semantics.

Tarski-like semantics
It was discovered that Tarski-like semantics for intuitionistic logic were not possible to prove complete. However, Robert Constable has shown that a weaker notion of completeness still holds for intuitionistic logic under a Tarski-like model. In this notion of completeness we are concerned not with all of the statements that are true of every model, but with the statements that are true in the same way in every model. That is, a single proof that the model judges a formula to be true must be valid for every model. In this case, there is not only a proof of completeness, but one that is valid according to intuitionistic logic.

Relation to other logics
Intuitionistic logic is related by duality to a paraconsistent logic known as Brazilian, anti-intuitionistic or dual-intuitionistic logic.

The subsystem of intuitionistic logic with the FALSE axiom removed is known as minimal logic.

Relation to many-valued logic 
Kurt Gödel's work involving many-valued logic showed in 1932 that intuitionistic logic is not a finite-valued logic.  (See the section titled Heyting algebra semantics above for an infinite-valued logic interpretation of intuitionistic logic.)

Relation to intermediate logics 
Any finite Heyting algebra that is not equivalent to a Boolean algebra defines (semantically) an intermediate logic. On the other hand, validity of formulae in pure intuitionistic logic is not tied to any individual Heyting algebra but relates to any and all Heyting algebras at the same time.

Relation to modal logic 
Any formula of the intuitionistic propositional logic (IPC) may be translated into the normal modal logic S4 as follows:

and it has been demonstrated that the translated formula is valid in the propositional modal logic S4 if and only if the original formula is valid in IPC. The above set of formulae are called the Gödel–McKinsey–Tarski translation.

There is also an intuitionistic version of modal logic S4 called Constructive Modal Logic CS4.

Lambda calculus
There is an extended Curry–Howard isomorphism between IPC and simply-typed lambda calculus.

See also

 BHK interpretation
 Computability logic
 Constructive proof
 Curry–Howard correspondence
 Game semantics
 Inhabited set
 Intermediate logics
 Intuitionistic type theory
 Kripke semantics
 Linear logic
 Paraconsistent logic
 Relevance theory
 Smooth infinitesimal analysis

Notes

References

 van Dalen, Dirk, 2001, "Intuitionistic Logic", in Goble, Lou, ed., The Blackwell Guide to Philosophical Logic. Blackwell
 Morten H. Sørensen, Paweł Urzyczyn, 2006, Lectures on the Curry-Howard Isomorphism (chapter 2: "Intuitionistic Logic").  Studies in Logic and the Foundations of Mathematics vol. 149, Elsevier
W. A. Carnielli (with A. B. M. Brunner)."Anti-intuitionism and paraconsistency".  Journal of Applied Logic Volume 3, Issue 1, Mar 2005, pp. 161–184
Arend Heyting, 1930, "Die formalen Regeln der intuitionistischen Logik," in three parts, Sitzungsberichte der preussischen Akademie der Wissenschaften: 42–71, 158–169.

External links
 Stanford Encyclopedia of Philosophy: "Intuitionistic Logic" by Joan Moschovakis
 Intuitionistic Logic by Nick Bezhanishvili and Dick de Jongh (from the Institute for Logic, Language and Computation at the University of Amsterdam)
 Semantical Analysis of Intuitionistic Logic I by Saul A. Kripke from Harvard University, Cambridge, Mass., USA
 Intuitionistic Logic by Dirk van Dalen
 The discovery of E. W. Beth's semantics for intuitionistic logic by A. S. Troelstra and P. van Ulsen
 Expressing Database Queries with Intuitionistic Logic by Anthony J. Bonner. L. Thorne McCarty. Kumar Vadaparty. Rutgers University, Department of Computer Science
 Tableaux'method for intuitionistic logic through S4-translation tests the intuitionistic validity of propositional formulae; provided by the Laboratoire d'Informatique de Grenoble
The Oxford Handbook of Philosophy of Mathematics and Logic: "Intuitionism in Mathematics" by David Charles McCarty

Logic in computer science
Non-classical logic
Constructivism (mathematics)
Systems of formal logic
Intuitionism